Cristian Bezzi (born May 13, 1975 in Reggio Emilia) is an Italian former rugby union player who played for Viadana in the north of Italy until the season 2007-08.

An established international, Bezzi played second fiddle to Santiago Dellapè and Marco Bortolami for the majority of his career. In 2003, Bezzi made the Italy squad to the World Cup in Australia. Since then he has captained Viadana to a number of achievements such as the final of the European Shield in 2004 and qualification for the Heineken Cup in 2007.

On 6 June 2008, Bezzi announced his retirement and now he works as assistant coach of Rugby Reggio Emilia's cadet squad.

Notes

1975 births
Living people
Italian rugby union players
Italy international rugby union players
Sportspeople from Reggio Emilia